The Suicide Machines is the third album by the American punk rock band The Suicide Machines, released in 2000 by Hollywood Records. It was the band's first album with drummer Ryan Vandeberghe, replacing Derek Grant who had left the group before the release of 1998's 'Battle Hymns'. The album's musical direction shifted away from the ska punk and hardcore styles of their previous albums and exhibited heavy pop influence, leading many to classify the album as pop punk, though elements of ska and hardcore did appear during the back half of the album. A music video was filmed for the single "Sometimes I Don't Mind", which reached #22 on Billboard'''s Modern Rock charts. The album itself ranked at #188 on the Billboard 200.

The album's closing track, "I Never Promised You a Rose Garden", was originally recorded for the soundtrack to the 1999 movie SLC Punk'' and was included on the film's soundtrack album.

Background 
The album's change in direction from the previous two albums had to do with the fact that Lukacinsky and Nunley got heavily into The Beatles and wanted to write poppier rock songs instead of their usual songs, while Navarro just wanted to write more punk songs. Navarro stayed out of the creative process of the album due to the fact he was dealing with personal issues and the fact that tensions were growing between Lukacinsky and Nunley with them basically hating each other and getting into fights constantly.

Track listing
All songs written by The Suicide Machines except where noted
"Sometimes I Don't Mind" - 3:14
"Permanent Holiday" - 2:07
"The Fade Away" - 3:09
"Too Many Words" - 2:17
"No Sale" - 2:24
"Green" - 2:08
"Extraordinary" - 2:45
"I Hate Everything" - 2:37
"All Out" - 1:53
"Perfect Day" - 2:09
"Sincerity" - 2:39
"Reasons" - 1:12
"Goodbye for Now" - 2:27
"I Never Promised You a Rose Garden" (written & originally performed by Joe South) - 2:42

Personnel
Jason Navarro - vocals
Dan Lukacinsky - guitar, backing vocals
Royce Nunley - bass, backing vocals
Ryan Vandeberghe - drums
Ice T- additional backing vocals on "I Hate Everything"
Joe Bishara - loops and programming
Patrick Warren - harmonium on "Extraordinary"
Bennett Salvay - orchestral arrangements and organ

Album information
Record label: Hollywood Records
Produced by Julian Raymond
All songs written by The Suicide Machines except "I Never Promised You a Rose Garden" by Joe South
Engineered by Greg Goldman and John Aguto with assistance by Bryan Cook, Alex Gibson, and German Villacorta
Mixed at Image Recording, Inc. by Chris Lord-Alge except tracks 5, 7, & 8 mixed by Tom Lord-Alge at Encore Studios in Burbank, California
Mastered by Bryan Gardener at Bernie Grundman Mastering in Hollywood, California
Art direction & design by Enny Joo
Photography by Brent Panelli
Creative director: Dave Snow

References

The Suicide Machines albums
Hollywood Records albums
2000 albums
Albums produced by Julian Raymond